Decimiana is a genus of mantises in the family Acanthopidae.

Species 
Decimiana bolivari (Chopard, 1916)
Decimiana clavata Ippolito & Lombardo, 2004
Decimiana elliptica Menezes & Bravo, 2012
Decimiana gaucha Maldaner & Rafael, 2017
Decimiana hebardi Lombardo, 2000
Decimiana rehni (Chopard, 1913)
Decimiana tessellata (Charpentier, 1841)

See also
List of mantis genera and species

References

Acanthopidae
Mantodea genera
Taxa named by Boris Uvarov